The Adriatic Abyssal Plain, more commonly referred to as the Adriatic Basin, is an oceanic basin under the Adriatic Sea.

Expanse
It is the largest Mediterranean shelf and is simultaneously a dilution basin and a site of bottom water formation.

The South Adriatic Basin is similar in many respects to the Northern Ionian Sea, to which it is connected.

See also
 List of submarine topographical features

References

Sources

Oceanic basins of the Atlantic Ocean
Landforms of the Mediterranean Sea
Adriatic Sea